Mercy High School is a private all-girls high school in Burlingame, California, United States. The school is part of the Roman Catholic Archdiocese of San Francisco, and is run by the Sisters of Mercy, founded by Catherine McAuley. It is housed in Kohl Mansion.

About 
Mercy High School is a private school, serving girls age 14 to 18 years old in grades 9 to 12. The school was opened in 1931. The prior mascot was the Crusader Rabbit. Today, the official mascot is simply “Crusader”, and the sports teams are referred to as the Crusaders.

The site of the school is also the Mercy Convent, a preschool, retirement center for the nuns, as well as a conference room and retreat at the Mercy Center.

Kohl Mansion

The English Tudor revival mansion was built for Charles Frederick Kohl and his second wife Mary Elisabeth "Bessie" (née Godey), as their country house. It was completed in 1914, however two years later the house was unused after the couple separated. In 1924, the mansion was sold to the Sisters of Mercy for $230,000. The main building was exclusively a convent from 1924 to 1931, and it has been the home of Mercy High School since 1931.

Hollywood used the estate when Disney filmed the movie Flubber in 1996, starring Robin Williams.

Notable alumni
 Jackie Speier, former California State Senator, Democratic Representative for California's 12th congressional district
 Suzanne Somers, actress
 Marilyn Lacey, founder and executive director of Mercy Beyond Borders, Sister of Mercy since 1966
 Toni Breidinger, American professional stock car racing driver
 Jenise Spiteri, Maltese American snowboarder
 Catriona Fallon, American rower

See also
San Mateo County high schools
Junipero Serra High School, San Mateo
Notre Dame High School, Belmont

References

External links
Mercy High School, Burlingame official website

Educational institutions established in 1931
Catholic secondary schools in California
Roman Catholic Archdiocese of San Francisco
Girls' schools in California
Burlingame, California
High schools in San Mateo County, California
Sisters of Mercy schools
1931 establishments in California